Agrilus cyanescens is a species of metallic wood-boring beetle in the family Buprestidae. It is found in Europe and Northern Asia (excluding China) and North America.

Subspecies
These two subspecies belong to the species Agrilus cyanescens:
 Agrilus cyanescens cyanescens (Ratzeburg, 1837)
 Agrilus cyanescens johanidesi Niehuis, 1999

References

Further reading

External links

 

cyanescens
Beetles of Asia
Beetles of Europe
Beetles of North America
Beetles described in 1837
Taxa named by Julius Theodor Christian Ratzeburg
Articles created by Qbugbot